Ratna Shumsher J.B.R. was the Inspector General of Police of Nepal Police from 1990 to 1993. He had also been the first Additional Inspector General of Nepal Police (AIGP). He was preceded by Hem Bahadur Singh was succeeded by Moti Lal Bohora as the police chief.

Ratna Shumsher J.B.R. was described by fellow police officers as a very honest police officer.

References

Living people
Year of birth missing (living people)
Nepalese police officers
Chiefs of police
Inspectors General of Police (Nepal)